Zeynep Özder (born 15 August 1980) is a Turkish television and film actress.

Life and career 
Zeynep Özder was born on 15 August 1980 in Ankara. At the age of 8 she started taking piano and cello lessons. After graduating from Ankara Anatolian Performing Arts High School, she enrolled in Bilkent University Conservatory and graduated with a degree in music and performing arts in 2004. She later received her master's degree in music from Gazi University and got her PhD in music teaching from the same school. Meanwhile, she served as a cellist on the Gazi University Academic Chamber Orchestra. She worked as a contract artist in the Presidential Symphony Orchestra between 2005 and 2007. She participated in concerts with the university orchestra in various countries. After graduating, she gave piano and cello lessons at Durul Gence Music School in 2009. She gave a concert with the Tekfen Philharmonic Orchestra in 2011.

Özder received acting lessons at the Stella Adler Studio in New York in 2011. She then joined Gaye Sökmen Agency, which managed her acting roles. In 2009, she made her television debut with her role as Eda in the series Samanyolu. In the following year she made her cinematic ddenut with Bir Avuç Deniz, in which she portrayed the character Dilek Hanoğlu. She continued her cinematic career with the movie Sen Kimsin?, which was released in 2012. She continued to have recurring roles in a number of TV series, including Dila Hanım, İntikam and 4N1K İlk Aşk. She rose to  prominence with her role as Fatma Pesend Hanım in the historical drama series Payitaht: Abdülhamid and as Begim Şehver Sultan in Alparslan: Büyük Selçuklu.

Filmography

Television

Film

References

External links 
 
 

1980 births
Actresses from Ankara
Living people
Bilkent University alumni
Gazi University alumni
Turkish television actresses
Turkish film actresses